Silver 'n Brass is an album by jazz pianist Horace Silver released on the Blue Note label in 1975, featuring performances by Silver with Tom Harrell, Bob Berg, Ron Carter, Al Foster, Bob Cranshaw, and Bernard Purdie with an overdubbed brass section arranged by Wade Marcus featuring Oscar Brashear, Bobby Bryant, Vincent DeRosa, Frank Rosolino, Maurice Spears, Jerome Richardson, and Buddy Collette.

The Allmusic review by Scott Yanow awarded the album 3 stars and states: "Although there are tributes to Tadd Dameron ('Dameron's Dance') and Duke Ellington ('The Sophisticated Hippie'), the music is recognizably Silver – funky hard bop."

Track listing
All compositions by Horace Silver
 "Barbara" -      
 "Dameron's Dance" -      
 "Adjustment" -     
 "Mysticism" -       
 "Kissin' Cousins" -       
 "The Sophisticated Hippie" -   
Recorded at A&R Studios, NYC, on January 10, 1975, with overdubs recorded at & Wally Heider Sound Studio III, Los Angeles, CA, on January 17, 1975.

Personnel
Horace Silver - piano
Tom Harrell - trumpet
Bob Berg - tenor saxophone
Ron Carter - bass (tracks 1-4)
Bob Cranshaw - bass (tracks 5 & 6)
Al Foster - drums (tracks 1-4)
Bernard Purdie - drums (tracks 5 & 6)
Oscar Brashear, Bobby Bryant - trumpet, flugelhorn
Vincent DeRosa - french horn
Frank Rosolino - trombone
Maurice Spears - bass trombone
Jerome Richardson - alto saxophone, soprano saxophone, flute
Buddy Collette - alto saxophone, flute
Wade Marcus - arranger

References

Horace Silver albums
1975 albums
Blue Note Records albums
Albums arranged by Wade Marcus
Albums produced by George Butler (record producer)